Başiğdir is a village in the Eflani district, Karabük Province, Black Sea Region of Turkey.

References

Villages in Karabük Province